The following is a list of the American television and radio and announcers that have broadcast the NASCAR All-Star Race over the years.

Television

2020s

2010s

2000s

Notes
In 2001, television coverage moved to FX as part of the new NASCAR television contract, and qualifying was changed so the pit stop took place at the start of the qualifying, and the stop was a four-tire change instead of two. Also starting in 2001, crew members were introduced together with drivers during the driver introduction ceremonies, with Fox broadcasters Chris Myers and Jeff Hammond interviewing selected persons during the ceremony.

1990s

Notes
Speedvision carried a special live in-car simulcast of the 1997 race.
ABC carried the race in 1990, with the Winston Open finish, and CBS carried both the Open and The Winston in 1991. The race was moved up one day to Saturday night, and it moved to live coverage on The Nashville Network (now Paramount Network) in 1992.

1980s

Notes
The 1986 event featured the Atlanta Invitational, a 100-lap race for drivers who did not meet the eligibility of The Winston. The Atlanta Invitational was held before The Winston, but due to a tape delay, ESPN aired the race after The Winston.
Keith Jackson, much better known for his work on college football and ABC's Wide World of Sports, called the 1987 event, known for the "Pass in the Grass". He was the network's NASCAR play-by-play announcer until the 1987 season.
From 1987 to 1990, ABC Sports covered reports on time trials on the Indianapolis 500, which ABC Sports also covered.
From its first year, the unique moniker "The Winston" was adopted by sponsor R. J. Reynolds. Rather than referring to the event as a traditional "All star" race, no generic reference was included in the title. Due to limitations on television tobacco advertising, other races which involved tobacco title sponsorship utilized generic names on network television. For example, on ABC, the Winston 500 was called the "Talladega 500" and the Marlboro 500 was called the "Michigan 500." Without a generic alternative, television and other media were forced to acknowledge Winston as the title sponsor, effectively skirting, and pushing the limits of tobacco advertising regulation.

Radio

Motor Racing Network is one of the two main radio broadcasters of the NASCAR Cup Series and Xfinity Series, covering events held at tracks owned by ISC, along with Dover International Speedway and Pocono Raceway. It also broadcasts the NASCAR All-Star Race, and the entire Truck Series season (although clearance of Xfinity and Truck Series events may vary by station). Almost all of the remaining races are broadcast by the Speedway Motorsports-owned Performance Racing Network (PRN), besides the Brickyard 400 (which is broadcast by the Indianapolis Motor Speedway Radio Network in association with PRN); many stations have affiliations with both MRN and PRN in order to air a full NASCAR schedule. All races are also carried on Sirius XM NASCAR Radio.

The lead announcers for the 2017 race's broadcast on MRN were Joe Moore, Jeff Striegle and Rusty Wallace. The network also implemented two announcers on each side of the track: Dave Moody in turns 1 and 2 and Kyle Rickey in turns 3 and 4. Alex Hayden, Winston Kelly, Kim Coon, and Steve Post were the network's pit lane reporters. The lead announcers for MRN in the following year were Mike Bagley, Jeff Striegle and Rusty Wallace. The network continued to implement two announcers on each side of the track: Dave Moody in turns 1 and 2 and Kyle Rickey in turns 3 and 4. Alex Hayden, Winston Kelly, Kim Coon, and Steve Post were the network's pit lane reporters. Alex Hayden became one of the lead announcers come 2019.

References

External links
NASCAR All-Star Race - NASCAR Cup Series
All-Star Race | Official Site Of NASCAR - NASCAR.com

All-Star Race
ABC Sports
CBS Sports
CBS Sports Spectacular
Fox Sports announcers
ESPN announcers
Broadcasters